BowieNet was an Internet service provider launched by singer-songwriter David Bowie in 1998 and active until 2006.

History
Bowie was an early user of the Internet, reportedly using email as early as the late 1980s, and in 1996 he released the song "Telling Lies" as an Internet download, the first downloadable single by a major artist.

In 1997 and 1998, Bowie worked with Robert Goodale and Ron Roy to understand the potential of the internet as a resource for music distribution and fan outreach. BowieNet launched in September 1998, and offered dial-up service access to the Internet for $19.95 per month or £10.00 in the UK. Users with another ISP could pay $5.95 to access www.davidbowie.com. For the service, Bowie partnered with the network services companies UltraStar and Concentric Network Corp (now XO Communications). At its peak, BowieNet had about 100,000 customers.

BowieNet ceased operating in 2006.

Exclusive content
Members received an @davidbowie.com-ending email address and had exclusive access to audio recordings, music videos and chat rooms, which Bowie participated in himself. Bowie went by the moniker "Sailor" in chat. He would appear unannounced and talk, with a special guest sometimes joining in, and on the site he would upload personal photos as well as images of his paintings and some of his journals. "Sailor" is an anagram of "Isolar", after which Bowie named his 1976 and 1978 world tours.

Song contest
In 1999, Bowie ran a contest through his website to help him co-write a song. Over 80,000 people submitted lyrics. The lyrics chosen were written by a 20-year-old American about the concept of a virtual existence on the internet. The recording of the song was live-streamed via a 360-degree interactive webcast, a groundbreaking technology at the time. The song titled, "What's Really Happening?", was later released on the 1999 album Hours.

LiveAndWell.com
In 1997, during Bowie's Earthling Tour, live tracks were recorded for a live album release, but the release was cancelled by Virgin, Bowie's label. Following that cancellation, Bowie assembled and released a different live album, made up of tracks recorded across several of Bowie's mid- to late-1990's tours, exclusively to BowieNet subscribers as LiveAndWell.com (1999). Re-released in 2000, again exclusively to BowieNet subscribers but with a bonus CD of remixes, LiveAndWell.com remained unavailable to non-subscribers until its public (re-)release in 2021, which did not include the bonus CD.

BowieWorld
The site offered access to BowieWorld, a 3D environment that allowed users to control an avatar that could walk through a three-dimensional city, decorated with images Bowie chose including pictures of himself and posters, and communicate with other users.

See also
Celebrity bond
The Nomad Soul
Cyberpunk, an album by Billy Idol which set several precedents in music promotion including the use of the Internet, multimedia software, and virtual communities

References

External links
 

David Bowie
Defunct Internet service providers
British music websites